The 2011 Middlesbrough Borough Council took place on Thursday 5 May 2011 to elect all 48 councillors, across 23 multi-member wards to Middlesbrough Borough Council. The Labour Party retained a majority on the council.

Overall results

A total of 63,433 valid votes were cast and there were 328 rejected ballots.
The turnout was 36.35%.

Council Composition

After the election the composition of the council was:

Con - Conservative Party
MI - Marton Independents
L - Liberal Democrats
G - Green Party

Results by ward

Acklam

Ayresome

Beckfield

Beechwood

Brookfield

Clairville

Coulby Newham

Gresham

Hemlington

Kader

Ladgate

Linthorpe

Marton

Marton West

Middlehaven

North Ormesby & Brambles Farm

Nunthorpe

Pallister

Park

Park End

Stainton and Thornton

Thorntree

University

References

2011 English local elections
2011
2010s in North Yorkshire